"Replay" is the debut single by British Virgin Islands singer Iyaz. It is the first single released from his debut album of the same name, which was released in 2009. The official remix features American rapper Flo Rida.

The single entered at the top of the UK Singles Chart, where it remained for three weeks until it was overtaken by "Fireflies" by Owl City. Internationally, the single also topped the charts in Australia, Israel and Switzerland and peaked within the top 10 of the charts in many countries, including Finland, France and the United States. The combined figure of the official music video and prequel video on YouTube is currently over 296+ million views.

Background and composition

Beluga Heights labelmates Sean Kingston, Jason Derulo, and Iyaz himself all co-wrote the song together, along with label owner J. R. Rotem and songwriting duo Planet VI (known as Rock City at the time). This was the second song that Derulo, Kingston and Rotem wrote together, the first being Derulo's own debut single, "Whatcha Say". Rotem also produced the track and credits himself at the beginning of the song via his signature "J-J-J-J-J.R." sample. The remix version with Flo Rida, however, says, "BELUGA HEIGHTS" like in Derulo's second single, "In My Head". Iyaz makes a reference to Apple's now-defunct MP3 player.

Eleven years later, the song went viral online again in June 2020, sparking numerous memes. It is set in the key of F♯ minor.

Chart performance
The song debuted in the UK at number one on 10 January 2010, selling over 106,000 copies in its first week, the highest sale for any new year release since Michelle McManus sold 118,000 copies of "All This Time" in the equivalent week in January 2004. It was also the first number-one single of the 2010s decade (not counting Lady Gaga's "Bad Romance", which also reached number-one in 2009). After two weeks at number one on the UK Singles Chart and six weeks at the top of the UK R&B Chart, "Replay" was succeeded by Owl City's "Fireflies" and Rihanna's "Rude Boy", respectively. It was the first song released in 2010 in the UK to be certified Gold with sales in excess of 400,000. In June 2010, it was announced that "Replay" was the third highest selling single of the year in the UK at that point.

In the US, "Replay" managed to reach the number-two spot on the Hot 100 for one week, behind only Kesha's "Tik Tok". As of December 2012, Replay has sold over four million digital copies.

Music video
The official music video features Iyaz wearing headphones and listening to music on a beach. Other various scenes feature Iyaz singing with a background of the British Virgin Islands' flag, and partying on the beach during the night.  The video was directed by Rock Jacobs. A prequel video was also filmed, featuring the full-length beach scenes with Iyaz and his love interest, played by Panamanian model Estelita Quintero.

Remixes
"Replay" (official remix) 
"Replay" (official remix #2) 
"Replay" (DJ Suketu's Call to Dhol mix)

Davai version
In 2017, Norwegian producer duo Davai released an EDM-inspired cover version, with new vocals by Cire. The song reached number 16 on the Norwegian Singles Chart.

Charts and certifications

Weekly charts

Year-end charts

Certifications

See also
List of Mainstream Top 40 number-one hits of 2009 (U.S.)
List of number-one singles from the 2010s (UK)
List of number-one R&B hits of 2010 (UK)
List of number-one singles in Australia in 2010
List of number-one hits of 2010 (Switzerland)
List of Billboard Rhythmic number-one songs of the 2010s

References

2009 debut singles
Song recordings produced by J. R. Rotem
Songs written by J. R. Rotem
Number-one singles in Australia
Number-one singles in Israel
Number-one singles in Scotland
UK Singles Chart number-one singles
Iyaz songs
Reggae fusion songs
Songs written by Theron Thomas
Songs written by Timothy Thomas
Songs written by Jason Derulo
2009 songs
2009 singles
Internet memes introduced in 2020